International Christian School is an international school located in Caracas, Venezuela. It was founded in 1990 as Academia Cristiana Internacional de Caracas. The school provides preschool (3 year old) through 12th Grade and is accredited by both Middle States Association of Colleges and Schools and Association of Christian Schools International. ICS Caracas is a part of the Network of International Christian Schools.

External links
 ICS - Caracas official website

American international schools in Venezuela
Schools in the Network of International Christian Schools
Schools in Caracas
Educational institutions established in 1990
1990 establishments in Venezuela